Destiny is a predetermined course of events or fixed natural order of the universe.

Destiny may also refer to:

People
 Destiny (given name), with a list of people so called
 Destiny (streamer) (born 1988), YouTube streamer and political debater
 Destiny (singer) (born 2002), Maltese singer

Arts and entertainment

Fiction
 Destiny (wordless novel), a 1926 wordless novel by Otto Nückel
 Destiny (Don Brown novel), a 2014 historical fiction novel written by Don Brown
 Destiny, a 1916 novel by Charles Neville Buck
 Destiny, a 2007 Dragonlance novel by Paul B. Thompson and Tonya C. Cook
 Star Trek: Destiny, a Star Trek crossover trilogy authored by David Alan Mack

Comics

DC Comics
 Doctor Destiny
 Destiny: A Chronicle of Deaths Foretold, a 1996 comic book mini-series published by Vertigo
 JLA: Destiny, a comic book mini-series published in 2002

Marvel Comics
 Destiny (Irene Adler), an adversary of the X-Men
 Destiny (Marvel Comics personification), the personification of fate
 Destiny (Paul Destine), a possessor of the Serpent Crown
 Destiny or Destiny Force, a powerful energy harnessed by Rick Jones

Film
 Destiny (1915 film), an American silent drama film 
 Destiny (1919 film), based on the novel by Charles Neville Buck
 Destiny (1921 film), a silent film directed in Germany by Fritz Lang
 Destiny (1925 film), a German silent drama film directed by Felix Basch
 Destiny (1927 film), a French silent film directed by Dimitri Kirsanoff
 Destiny (1938 film), a drama film directed by Mario Mattoli
 Destiny (1942 film), an Austrian-German historical drama film directed by Géza von Bolváry
 Destiny (1944 film), an American drama film noir directed by Reginald Le Borg
 Destiny (1951 film), an Italian drama film directed by Enzo Di Gianni
 Destiny (1977 film), a film directed by Yevgeny Matveyev
 Destiny (1997 film), a French-Egyptian historical drama film directed by Youssef Chahine
 Destiny (2006 film), a Turkish drama film directed by Zeki Demirkubuz
 The Destiny, a 2010 Bhutanese Dzongkha language film
 Destiny (2018 film), an Indian romantic drama comedy short film

Television
 "Destiny" (Angel), a 2003 episode of the TV series Angel
 "Destiny" (Legends of Tomorrow), an episode of the TV series Legends of Tomorrow
 "Destiny" (Queen of Swords), first episode of the 2000 TV series Queen of Swords
 "Destiny" (Star Trek: Deep Space Nine), a 1995 episode of the TV series Star Trek: Deep Space Nine
 Mobile Suit Gundam SEED Destiny, a 2007 anime television series
 Destiny Evans, a fictional character from the American soap opera One Life to Live

Video games
 Destiny: World Domination from Stone Age to Space Age, 1996 4X video game developed and published by Interactive Magic
 Destiny (video game series), a science fantasy video game series created by Bungie
 Destiny (video game), the first title in the Destiny video game series

Music
 Destiny (Janáček), a 1907 opera in three acts by Leoš Janáček
 Destiny (band), a heavy metal/progressive metal band from Gothenburg, Sweden

Albums
 Destiny (Barrio Boyzz album), 2000
 Destiny (Beckah Shae album), 2011
 Celtic Woman: Destiny, 2015
 Destiny (Chaka Khan album), 1986
 Destiny (Gloria Estefan album), 1996
 Destiny (The Jacksons album), 1978
 Destiny (Jolina Magdangal album), 2008
 Destiny (Marilyn Crispell album), 1995
 Destiny?, 1998, by the Canadian progressive rock band Mystery
 Destiny (No Angels album), 2007
 Destiny (Saxon album), 1988
 Destiny (Shai album), 1999
 Destiny (Stratovarius album), 1998
 Destiny, 1999 album by Jim Brickman
 Destiny, 2002 J-pop album by Miki Matsuhashi

Songs
 "Destiny" (Dem 2 song), 1998
 "Destiny" (Jim Brickman song), 1999
 "Destiny" (Zero 7 song), 2001
 "Destiny" (Schiller song), 2008
 "Destiny" (Infinite song), 2013
 "Destiny", a song by the English electronic band Syntax
 "Destiny", a 1985 song from the Jennifer Rush album Movin'
 "Destiny", a 1993 song from the Death album Individual Thought Patterns
 "Destiny", a 1997 song from the Buju Banton album Inna Heights
 "Destiny", a 2001 song from the Heavenly album Sign of the Winner
 "Destiny", a 2002 song from the Bulldog Mansion album Funk
 "Destiny", a 2010 song from the Galneryus album Resurrection
 "Destiny", a 2014 song from the Ronnie Radke mixtape Watch Me
 "Destiny", a 2015 song from the Borealis album Purgatory
 "Destiny", a 2017 song from the Perception album "Perception_(NF_album)" by NF "NF_(rapper)"
 "Destiny", a song by Take 6 from the compilation album The Prince of Egypt (Inspirational)
 "Destiny", the title song of a 2001 single by Miki Matsuhashi

Other
 DESTINY+, a planned space mission to asteroid 3200 Phaethon
Dark Energy Space Telescope (Destiny), a planned project by NASA and the U.S. Department of Energy, designed to perform precision measurements of the universe
Destiny (Greek political party), a defunct political party in Greece
Destiny (ISS module), the primary operating facility for U.S. research payloads aboard the International Space Station
Destiny (magazine), a South African women's magazine
Destiny Church (New Zealand), a Pentecostal fundamentalist Christian movement headquartered in Auckland, New Zealand
Destiny Church Groningen, a neo-charismatic church denomination founded in Groningen, the Netherlands
Destiny New Zealand (2003–2007), a Christian political party in New Zealand
Carnival Destiny, a Destiny-class cruise ship owned and operated by Carnival Cruise Lines
Destiny USA, a retail and entertainment complex in Syracuse, New York
Destiny (fireboat), a 2007 fireboat operated by the Tacoma Fire Department in Washington state
Destiny (horse) (1833–?), British Thoroughbred racehorse
Destiny, Florida, an urban development project in Osceola County, Florida
Destiny Cable, a cable TV company in the Philippines
Univel Destiny, a desktop version of Unix later released as UnixWare 1.0 by an AT&T and Novell joint venture

See also

 
 
 My Destiny (disambiguation)